To The Age of Innocence is the first greatest hits album by Claire Kuo.  It was released on 30 August 2013 by Linfair Records.

Track listing

References

Claire Kuo albums
2013 greatest hits albums